Ferma may refer to:
Ferma, Greece, a village in Crete
Ferma, Poland, a village in Podlaskie Voivodeship of Poland
Ferma, Russia, several rural localities in Russia
Ferma (TV series), the Romanian version of the reality television show The Farm

See also
Fermo, a town and comune of the Marche, Italy
Province of Fermo, Italy